Isabella Holpfer (born 6 January 2001) is an amateur golfer from Austria. She won the Junior Vagliano Trophy in 2015 and 2017, and was a finalist in The R&A's Girls Amateur Championship in 2018 and 2019.

Amateur career
Holpfer was born in Vienna in 2001 to an Austrian father and a mother from Minnesota. She began competing in golf at a young age, and in 2009 in participated in the Austrian "Schüler Golf Cup U10" tournaments, eventually winning 21 events in her age group. Between 2010 and 2013 she also participated in the U.S. KidsGolf World Championship in Pinehurst, North Carolina.

Holpfer joined the Austrian National Team and represented her country at the 2014, 2015, 2016 and 2017 European Girls' Team Championships and at the 2019 and 2021 European Ladies' Team Championship. The top performance came in 2015 where she helped Austria earn a bronze medal at Golf Resort Kaskada in Kurin, Czech Republic. She helped Europe capture the Junior Vagliano Trophy in both 2015 and again in 2017, where she posted a perfect 4–0 record to help the Europeans defeat Great Britain and Ireland by 15–3. 

She also excelled individually. Holpfer won the 2014 Austrian Match Play Championship at Salzkammergut Golf Club as a 13-year-old, the event's youngest winner ever. She recorded multiple international victories, including at the 2015 Irish Women's Open Stroke Play Championship, where she posted a par on the first extra hole in a sudden-death playoff with Chloe Ryan at Dún Laoghaire Golf Club to secure the title, after both golfers finished the 54-hole event at 221.

In 2018, Holpfer shot a 1-under 287 to capture the Slovenian Ladies Amateur in Livada, holding off Pia Babnik of Slovenia and fellow Austrian Emma Spitz by one stroke. Holpfer also notched additional top-10 finishes at the French International Lady Juniors Amateur Championship (5th), the Spanish Ladies Amateur (5th) and the Portuguese Ladies Amateur (8th). She wrapped up the 2018 season with a dominating 11-stroke win at the English Women's Strokeplay at Coventry Golf Club, where she led wire-to-wire after posting a 7-under 66 in the opening round and eventually finished at 13-under.

Holpfer finished runner-up at both the 2018 and 2019 R&A Girls Amateur Championship. In 2018, at Ardglass Golf Club in Northern Ireland, Holpfer never trailed in her first four matches, and recorded a 2 and 1 victory over Alessia Nobilio in the quarterfinals. She was defeated, 2 and 1, in the final by fellow Austrian Emma Spitz, who become the first Austrian to win the Girls Amateur. In 2019, she lost the final, 4 and 3, to Pia Babnik in the championship match at Panmure Golf Club.

Holpfer finished runner-up in her debut event on the LET Access Series, the 2019 VP Bank Ladies Open at Gams-Werdenberg Golf Club in Gams, Switzerland, where she lost a playoff to home player Elena Moosmann. In total, she recorded 28 top-10 finishes in 82 WAGR events between 2014 and 2020, and reached a rank of 25th in the World Amateur Golf Ranking.

College career
In 2020, Holpfer enrolled at the University of Georgia as a journalism major and started playing with the Georgia Bulldogs women's golf team.

Amateur wins
2014 Austrian Match Play Championship
2015 Irish Women's Open Stroke Play Championship
2018 English Women's Open Amateur Stroke Play Championship, Slovenian Ladies Amateur

Source:

Team appearances
Amateur
European Young Masters (representing Austria): 2014
Junior Vagliano Trophy (representing the Continent of Europe): 2015 (winners), 2017 (winners)
European Girls' Team Championship (representing Austria): 2015, 2016, 2017
European Ladies' Team Championship (representing Austria): 2019, 2021
Espirito Santo Trophy (representing Austria): 2022

Source:

References

External links

Austrian female golfers
Amateur golfers
Georgia Bulldogs women's golfers
Sportspeople from Vienna
2001 births
Living people
21st-century Austrian women